Simamkele Namba (born 3 October 1998) is a South African rugby sevens player. She represented South Africa at the 2022 Rugby World Cup Sevens in Cape Town.

Namba was selected in South Africa's women's fifteens team for the Rugby World Cup in New Zealand.

References 

Living people
1998 births
Female rugby sevens players
South African female rugby union players
South Africa international women's rugby sevens players